MKQ or mkq may refer to:

 MKQ, the IATA code for Mopah International Airport, Merauke, Papua, Indonesia
 mkq, the ISO 639-3 code for Bay Miwok language, California, United States